Pterophorus aliubasignum is a moth of the family Pterophoridae. It is known from New Guinea.

References

External links
Papua Insects

aliubasignum
Moths described in 2000